Colin Shaw is a retired football (soccer) player who represented New Zealand at the international level.

Shaw scored on his full All Whites debut in a 3–5 loss to Australia on 5 November 1967 and ended his international playing career with five A-international caps, scoring 8 goals, including back to back hat-tricks against Malaysia and Fiji. His final cap was an appearance in a 1–3 loss to New Caledonia on 8 October 1968.

Career statistics

International goals

References 

Year of birth missing (living people)
Living people
New Zealand association footballers
New Zealand international footballers
Association footballers not categorized by position